Alkaline ceramidase 1 also known as ACER1 is a ceramidase enzyme which in humans is encoded by the ACER1 gene.

Function 

ACER1 mediates cellular differentiation by controlling the generation of sphingosine (SPH) and sphingosine-1-phosphate (S1P).

Model organisms

Model organisms have been used in the study of ACER1 function. A conditional knockout mouse line called Acer1tm1a(EUCOMM)Wtsi was generated at the Wellcome Trust Sanger Institute. Male and female animals underwent a standardized phenotypic screen to determine the effects of deletion. Additional screens performed:  - In-depth immunological phenotyping - in-depth bone and cartilage phenotyping

References

External links

Further reading 

 
 
 
 

Human proteins